Víska is a municipality and village in Havlíčkův Brod District in the Vysočina Region of the Czech Republic. It has about 200 inhabitants.

Notable people
Jan Nevole (1812–1903), architect

References

Villages in Havlíčkův Brod District